Juron Criner (born December 12, 1989) is a former American football wide receiver. Born in Las Vegas, Nevada, Criner attended Canyon Springs High School and played college football at the University of Arizona. He played for the Oakland Raiders and New York Giants of the National Football League, and for the Ottawa Redblacks and Edmonton Eskimos of the Canadian Football League.

College career
Criner played college football at the University of Arizona. In 2008 as a freshman, Criner caught 8 passes for 88 yards and a touchdown in 13 games and 3 starts. As a sophomore in 2009, he caught 45 passes for 582 yards and 9 touchdowns over 13 games and 5 starts. Criner was injured prior to the 2010 season but did not miss any games as a result. As a junior in 2010, Criner caught 73 passes for 1,186 yards and 8 touchdowns prior to the bowl game. In a loss to Oregon State, Criner caught 12 passes for 179 and a touchdown.

Professional career

Oakland Raiders

The Raiders drafted Criner in round five of the 2012 NFL draft. He had 16 catches for 151 yards in 12 games as a rookie in the 2012 season.

He was inactive most of the 2013 season, seeing action in just one game against the Eagles where he caught three passes for 32 yards. He had been surpassed on the depth chart by rookie round seven pick, Brice Butler and then found himself behind Andre Holmes as well once Holmes returned from a 4-game suspension to begin the year.  In the game against the Eagles in week nine he suffered an acromioclavicular joint sprain in his right shoulder. Shortly thereafter, on November 23, 2013, the Oakland Raiders placed him on injured reserve effectively ending his 2013 season. The Raiders waived Criner on August 26, 2014.

New York Giants
On September 24, 2014, Criner was signed to the New York Giants' practice squad. On September 1, 2015, he was waived by the Giants.

Ottawa Redblacks 
On April 14, 2016, the Ottawa Redblacks of the Canadian Football League announced the signing of Juron Criner in time for spring mini-camp. In his first year in the CFL, Criner played in 6 regular season games catching 12 passes for 269 yards with 1 touchdown. He caught 7 passes for 177 yards in Ottawa's two playoff games en route to winning the 104th Grey Cup.

References

External links
 
 Oakland Raiders bio
 Arizona Wildcats bio

1989 births
American football wide receivers
Canadian football wide receivers
American players of Canadian football
Arizona Wildcats football players
Living people
Oakland Raiders players
New York Giants players
Ottawa Redblacks players
Players of American football from Nevada
Sportspeople from Las Vegas
Edmonton Elks players